Heinrich Lefler (7 November 1863, in Vienna – 14 March 1919, in Vienna) was an Austrian painter, graphic artist and stage designer. His father was the painter Franz Lefler.

Life and work
From 1880 to 1884, he studied at the Academy of Fine Arts Vienna under Christian Griepenkerl and, from 1884, at the Academy of Fine Arts Munich under Nikolaus Gysis and Wilhelm von Diez. In 1891, he became a member of the Society of Austrian Artists and, in 1900, was a founding member of the Hagenbund. From 1900 to 1903, he was an assistant to Anton Brioschi, the head designer at the Vienna State Opera, following which he became a professor at the Academy until 1910. While at the Vienna Opera, he designed a set for the Metropolitan Opera and shipped the pieces to New York.

Besides the time spent in his formal occupations, he spent a great deal of time in Weißenbach an der Triesting with his father and his brother-in-law, Joseph Urban, a fellow scenic designer, where they painted murals on villas and hotels, designed invitation cards for summer festivals and, with librettist Camillo Walzel, staged theatrical productions for children.

The team of Lefler and Urban created many public events as well, including the 1905 Schiller Festival parade and a procession along the Ringstraße in 1908, on the occasion of the Emperor's 60th Jubilee. Lefler also designed banknotes, financial warrants and promotional posters for several companies, including Auerlicht and Krupp. Many of Lefler's costumes and stage designs have been preserved in the Max Reinhardt Collection at Harvard.

In 1903, he married opera singer Mina Wiesmüller, who modeled the portrait that appears in his design for the 1000 Kronen banknote.

In 1932, a street in Vienna, Donaustadt was renamed the "Heinrich-Lefler-Gasse" in his honor.

References

Further reading 
 Felix Czeike: Historisches Lexikon Wien. Vol. 4: Le – Ro. Kremayr & Scheriau, Wien 2004, . 
 Ludwig Eisenberg: Das geistige Wien. Künstler- und Schriftsteller-Lexikon. Mittheilungen über Wiener Architekten, Bildhauer, Bühnenkünstler, Graphiker, Journalisten, Maler, Musiker und Schriftsteller. 5 Vols. Daberkow u. a., Wien 1889–1893.
 Heinz Kindermann: Theatergeschichte Europas. 10 Vols. Müller, Salzburg 1966–1974.
 Peter Pauker: Heinrich Lefler, sein Werk und seine Zeit. Wien 1962 (Wien, Universität, phil. Dissertation, 15 July 1963).
 Neues Wiener Tagblatt, 15.03.1919, p.9. Obituary.

External links 

 
   Illustrations from "Die Prinzessin und die Schweinehirt" (The Princess and the Pigman, by Hans Christian Andersen), 1897
  Archiv des Triestingtaler Heimatmuseums Weissenbach
 Bernhard Denscher: Heinrich Lefler

1863 births
1919 deaths
Austrian illustrators
Austrian scenic designers
Academy of Fine Arts Vienna alumni
Lohengrin